The Seventh Seal is a 1957 Swedish historical fantasy film written and directed by Ingmar Bergman. 

The Seventh Seal may also refer to:
The seventh seal, a concept in Christian eschatology
The Seventh Seal (Morgana Lefay album), 1999
The Seventh Seal (Rakim album), 2009
"The Seventh Seal", from Scott Walker's 1969 album Scott 4
"The Seventh Seal", Op. 50 (1972) by W. Francis McBeth
"The Seventh Seal", from Van Halen's 1995 album Balance
"The Seventh Seal", from Groundation's 2004 album We Free Again